"She's Leaving Home" is a song by the English rock band the Beatles, written by Paul McCartney and John Lennon, and released on their 1967 album Sgt. Pepper's Lonely Hearts Club Band. Paul McCartney wrote and sang the verse and John Lennon wrote the chorus, which they sang together. Neither George Harrison nor Ringo Starr was involved in the recording. The song's instrumental background was performed entirely by a small string orchestra arranged by Mike Leander, and is one of only a handful of Beatles recordings in which none of the members played a musical instrument.

Background
Paul McCartney said of the song in his Playboy magazine interview in December 1984:

McCartney was inspired by a story on the front page of the Daily Mirror, about a girl named Melanie Coe. Although McCartney invented most of the content in the song, Coe, who was 17 at the time, has said that most of it was accurate. In actuality, Coe left with her boyfriend, a croupier. She did not "meet a man from the motor trade", although her boyfriend previously had been in that trade. She left in the afternoon while her parents were at work, while the girl in the song leaves early in the morning as her parents sleep. Coe was found ten days later because she had let slip where her boyfriend worked. When she returned home, she was pregnant and had an abortion.

Coincidentally, Coe had actually met McCartney three years earlier, in 1963 when he chose her as the prize winner in a dancing contest on ITV's Ready Steady Go!. An update on Coe appeared in The Guardian in December 2008, and she was interviewed about the song on the BBC programme The One Show on 24 November 2010. In May 2017, Rolling Stone magazine carried an interview with Coe to commemorate the 50th anniversary of the album's release.

Recording
"She's Leaving Home" was recorded during the sessions for the Beatles' Sgt. Pepper's Lonely Hearts Club Band. The day before McCartney wanted to work on the song's score, he learned that George Martin, who usually handled the Beatles' string arrangements, was not available. McCartney contacted Mike Leander, who did it in Martin's place. This was the first time a Beatles song was not arranged by Martin. Martin, though hurt by this, produced the song and conducted the string section in a session on 17 March 1967 that generated six takes. The melody is composed in a modal scale, typical of English traditional music. The harp was played by Sheila Bromberg, the first female musician to appear on a Beatles record.  Three days later, McCartney's lead vocal and Lennon's backing vocal were recorded, with the two singing together on each of two vocal tracks, their voices overlapping to match the narrative.

The stereo version of the song, finalised on 17 April 1967, runs at a slower speed than the mono mix, completed on 20 March 1967, and consequently is a semitone lower in pitch. A 2007 Mojo magazine article revealed that the final mono mix was sped up to make McCartney sound younger. The subsequent stereo mix was not sped up, remaining in the original tempo and key.  In 2017, for the 50th anniversary edition of Sgt. Pepper's Lonely Hearts Club Band, Giles Martin and Sam Okell remixed the stereo version of the song to match the adjusted speed of the mono version. The six-disc version of the anniversary edition also included the previously unreleased first mono mix of "She's Leaving Home", which contains a brief cello phrase at the end of the first two choruses that was removed from the released mixes of the song.

Critical reception
In April 1967, McCartney visited Brian Wilson of the Beach Boys in Los Angeles, where McCartney played "She's Leaving Home" on the piano for Wilson and his wife. Wilson recalled: "We both just cried. It was beautiful." As the credited composers of "She's Leaving Home", Lennon and McCartney received the 1967 Ivor Novello award for Best Song Musically and Lyrically.

Composer Ned Rorem once described "She's Leaving Home" as "equal to any song that Schubert ever wrote". In one of the few non-laudatory contemporary reviews of Sgt. Pepper, Richard Goldstein, writing in The New York Times, cited the song as an example of the album's reliance on production over quality songwriting. Goldstein said: She's Leaving Home' preserves all the orchestrated grandeur of 'Eleanor Rigby', but its framework is emaciated ... Where 'Eleanor Rigby' compressed tragedy into poignant detail, 'She's Leaving Home' is uninspired narrative, and nothing more." Author Ian MacDonald considered "She's Leaving Home" to be one of the two best songs on the album, along with "A Day in the Life". In his comments on Sgt. Pepper and its legacy, musicologist Allan Moore highlights these contrasting views as two music critics judging the work from "opposing criteria", with Goldstein opining during the dawn of the counterculture of the 1960s, whereas MacDonald, writing in the 1990s, is "intensely aware of [the movement's] failings".

In 2018, the music staff of Time Out London ranked "She's Leaving Home" at number 10 on their list of the best Beatles songs.

Personnel
According to Ian MacDonald:

The Beatles
Paul McCartney – double-tracked lead vocal
John Lennon – double-tracked alternate lead vocals on chorus

Additional musicians
Mike Leander – string arrangement
George Martin – conductor, producer
Erich Gruenberg – violin
Derek Jacobs – violin
Trevor Williams – violin
José Luis García – violin
John Underwood – viola
Stephen Shingles – viola
Dennis Vigay – cello
Alan Dalziel – cello
Peter Halling – cello
Gordon Pearce – double bass
Sheila Bromberg – harp

Billy Bragg version 

A version of the song by Billy Bragg with Cara Tivey reached number one on the UK Singles Chart in 1988, as part of a double-A side with "With a Little Help from My Friends" by Wet Wet Wet. Both tracks were taken from the charity fundraising album Sgt. Pepper Knew My Father.

Notes

References

External links
 Interview with harpist and Ringo Starr

1960s ballads
Pop ballads
The Beatles songs
1967 songs
UK Singles Chart number-one singles
Song recordings produced by George Martin
Songs written by Lennon–McCartney
Harry Nilsson songs
Baroque pop songs
Songs published by Northern Songs
Songs based on actual events
Songs about teenagers
Songs about parenthood
Billy Bragg songs